Ecotourism Society Pakistan (ESP) is an organization based in Pakistan which seeks to promote ecotourism in the mountain eco-regions of Pakistan as a way of raising the standard of living in those areas.

References

External links
Official site of ESP http://www.ecotourism.org.pk
 Official UNEP web page about ESP

Environmental organisations based in Pakistan
Ecotourism
Organizations established in 1997